The Schildenstein is a 1613 m high mountain in the Mangfall Mountains in Bavaria.
The peak can be reached after an easy hike from Kreuth over the Geißalm and Königsalm. The route via the Wolfsschlucht, on the other hand, is made secure by wire cables.  The Blauberge are connected to the East side of the Schildenstein.

The Kavalierhaus on the Königsalm was built in 1818 by the King of Bavaria, Maximilian I. The king was said to have frequented the Alpine pasture. The wooden structure  nearby dates from 1723, and is the largest historic alpine hut in the Miesbach district.

External links 
 "Der Schildenstein: Steinmandl.de (German)
 Tour description (German)

Mountains of Bavaria
Mountains of the Alps